The 2022–23 season is Sepahan's 69th season in existence, and their 42nd consecutive season in the top flight of Iran football. It is also the club's 22nd consecutive season in the Persian Gulf Pro League. The club will compete in the Persian Gulf Pro League and Hazfi Cup.

First-team squad 
Last updated: 

 (on loan from Portimonense)

 U21 = Under 21 year player. U23 = Under 23 year player. U25 = Under 25 year player. INJ = Out of main squad due to injury.

Transfers

Summer

In:

Out:

Winter

In:

Out:

Pre-season and friendlies

Competitions

Overview

Persian Gulf Pro League

Standings

Results by round

Matches

Hazfi Cup

References

External links
  Club Official Website
  The Club page in Soccerway.com
  The Club page in Persianleague.com

 
Sepahan